The Ayeyarwady bulbul (Pycnonotus blanfordi) is a member of the bulbul family of passerine birds. It is endemic to Myanmar.
Its natural habitat is subtropical or tropical moist lowland forests. Until 2016, the Ayeyarwady bulbul was considered to be conspecific with the streak-eared bulbul (now Pycnonotus conradi).

References

Ayeyarwady bulbul
Birds of Southeast Asia
Ayeyarwady bulbul